Sheldon Blockburger (born September 19, 1964) is a retired male decathlete from the United States, who competed in the late 1980s and the early 1990s. He won the SEC Decathlon Championship in 1986 (breaking the SEC record) and won the 1987 SEC indoor pentathlon title with a world record score of 4451. He set his personal best in the men's decathlon event (8301 points) on June 13, 1990, at the US National Championships in Norwalk, California.  He won the bronze medal at the 1991 Pan American Games.  He was also the first ever American champion in the indoor heptathlon in 1995. In 1993, he became the first American to win the Italian Multi Stars decathlon, scoring 8296. In 1994, he became the first American to break 8000 points in the prestigious Hypo Bank meeting in Gotzis, Austria. Blockburger began his college coaching career in 1996 at California Polytechnic State University San Luis Obispo and coached three NCAA track and field champions. He left Cal Poly in 2005 for another coaching position at the university of Arizona. While at Arizona Blockburger coached 11 NCAA champions (9 x high jump, 2 x decathlon) and had 5 runner up finishes. He left for USC in 2015, where he had two NCAA high jump champions and was a part of the 2018 Women’s team NCAA Championship. He returned to the University of Arizona in 2018 and left after the COVID-19 shortened 2020 season. Blockburger coached athletes at the 2003, 2007, 2009, 2011 and 2013 IAAF Track and Field World Championships with high jumper Brigetta Barrett winning the silver medal at 2.00m. He coached in the 2004 and 2012 Olympics with Brigetta Barrett winning the silver medal with a NCAA record jump of 2.03m (6-8”). Blockburger has twins that were born in 2002 and is married to Cynthia.

Achievements

References

Profile

1964 births
Living people
American male decathletes
Athletes (track and field) at the 1991 Pan American Games
Pan American Games medalists in athletics (track and field)
Pan American Games bronze medalists for the United States
Medalists at the 1991 Pan American Games